is a city located in the western portion of Tokyo Metropolis, Japan. , the city had an estimated population of 187,048, and a population density of 6800 persons per km².

Geography
Hino is in Western Tokyo. The city has three geographical regions. The western part is called the Hino plateau, approximately 100 meters above sea level. The southern part is Tama Hills, between 150 and 200 meters above sea level. The eastern part of the city is an alluvial plain of the Tama River.

Surrounding municipalities
Tokyo Metropolis
Fuchū
Kunitachi
Tachikawa
Akishima
Hachiōji
Tama

Climate
Hino has a Humid subtropical climate (Köppen Cfa) characterized by warm summers and cool winters with light to no snowfall.  The average annual temperature in Hino is 13.9 °C. The average annual rainfall is 1647 mm with September as the wettest month. The temperatures are highest on average in August, at around 25.4 °C, and lowest in January, at around 2.9 °C.

Demographics
Per Japanese census data, the population of Musashino increased rapidly in the 1950s through 1980s, but has remained relatively constant for the past 40 years.

History
The area of present-day Hino was part of ancient Musashi Province. During the Edo period, the village of Hino developed as a post station on the Kōshū Kaidō.

In the post-Meiji Restoration cadastral reform of 1871, Hino-juku became part of Kanagawa Prefecture. In the reorganization of districts in 1889, Hino-juku came under the jurisdiction of Minamitama District. The entire district was transferred to the control of Tokyo Prefecture on April 1, 1893, at which time Hino-juku was proclaimed Hino Town under the modern municipalities system. The area of the town expanded through annexation of neighboring villages in 1901 and 1958. On November 3, 1963, Hino was elevated to city status.

Government
Hino has a mayor-council form of government with a directly elected mayor and a unicameral city council of 24 members. Hino contributes two members to the Tokyo Metropolitan Assembly. In terms of national politics, the city is part of Tokyo 21st district of the lower house of the Diet of Japan.

Politics
2005 Hino mayoral election

Economy
Hino is largely a regional commercial center and bedroom community for central Tokyo.

Hino is the hometown of Orient Watch Co., Ltd. established in 1950 by Shogoro Yoshida.

On December 22, 2008, operations of Seiko Epson's Tokyo sales office began at Seiko Epson's Hino Office. Previously operations were at the World Trade Center in Minato, Tokyo.

Hino also houses the headquarters of Hino Motors, a Toyota Group company producing semi-trailer trucks (British and Irish: articulated lorries), box trucks and buses.

Education

Universities
Tokyo Metropolitan University – Hino campus
Meisei University
Jissen Women's University
Sugino Fashion College – Hino campus

Primary and secondary
There are three metropolitan high schools operated by the Tokyo Metropolitan Government Board of Education.
 
 
 

Hino has 17 municipal elementary schools and eight public junior high schools operated by the Hino City Board of Education.

Municipal junior high schools:
 Hino No. 1 (日野第一中学校)
 Hino No. 2 (日野第二中学校)
 Hino No. 3 (日野第三中学校)
 Hino No. 4 (日野第四中学校)
 Hirayama (平山中学校)
 Misawa (三沢中学校)
 Nanao (七生中学校)
 Ohsakaue (大坂上中学校)

Municipal elementary schools:
 Asahigaoka (旭が丘小学校)
 Hino No. 1 (日野第一小学校)
 Hino No. 3 (日野第三小学校)
 Hino No. 4 (日野第四小学校)
 Hino No. 5 (日野第五小学校)
 Hino No. 6 (日野第六小学校)
 Hino No. 7 (日野第七小学校)
 Hino No. 8 (日野第八小学校)
 Hirayama (平山小学校)
 Juntoku (潤徳小学校)
 Minamidaira (南平小学校)
 Nakada (仲田小学校)
 Nanaomidori (七生緑小学校)
 Takiai (滝合小学校)
 Tokoji (東光寺小学校)
 Toyoda (豊田小学校)
 Yumeagaoka (夢が丘小学校)

Transportation

Railway
 JR East – JR East  – Chūō Main Line
  - 
 Keio Corporation - Keio Corporation  – Keiō Line
  -  -  - 
 Keio Corporation - Keio Corporation  – Keiō Dōbutsuen Line
   - 
 Tokyo Tama Intercity Monorail - Tama Toshi Monorail Line
  -  -  -  -

Highway
   Chūō Expressway 
 (Hino Bypass)

Local attractions
Tama Zoological Park

Sister cities
  Redlands, California, United States, from February 2004
 Shiwa, Iwate Prefecture, Japan, from January 2017

Notable people from Hino 

Hijikata Toshizō, Bakumatsu period samurai
Tomonobu Hiroi, Professional soccer player
Inoue Genzaburō, Bakumatsu period samurai
Yuzo Koshiro, composer
Yuriko Yamamoto, voice actress

See also

References

External links

Hino City Official Website 

 
Cities in Tokyo
Western Tokyo